Eastern High School may refer to:


United States
Eastern High School (Pekin, Indiana), Pekin, Indiana
Eastern High School (Louisville, Kentucky), Middletown, Kentucky
Eastern High School (Maryland), Baltimore, Maryland
Eastern High School (Michigan), Lansing, Michigan
Eastern High School (Beaver, Ohio), Beaver, Ohio
Eastern High School (Reedsville, Ohio), Reedsville, Ohio
Eastern High School (Winchester, Ohio), Winchester, Ohio
Eastern High School (Washington, D.C.), Washington, D.C.

Other places
Eastern High School, Cardiff, Wales, United Kingdom

See also
Bristol Eastern High School, Bristol, Connecticut, U.S.
Eastern Christian High School, North Haledon, New Jersey, U.S.
Eastern Hills Senior High School, a high school in Perth, Western Australia, Australia
Eastern Junior-Senior High School, Greentown, Indiana, U.S.
Eastern Mennonite School, Harrisonburg, Virginia, U.S.
Eastern Regional High School, Voorhees, New Jersey, U.S.
Eastern Technical High School, Essex, Maryland, U.S.
East High School (disambiguation)